Joshua T. Bates is a fictional character from the series of books Joshua T. Bates by Susan Shreve. Joshua has an older sister named Amanda, who was formerly Ms. Smarty Pants but now she's no longer smart and is more concerned about whether boys like her or not. Joshua also has a younger baby sister named Georgina. He has several enemies, who are involved in all of the books, including Tommy Wilhelm and Billy Nickels. Joshua also has a dog named Plutarch and a cat. Joshua's best friend is named Andrew Porter, and Joshua has a new friend named Sean O'Malley.

Other Joshua T. Bates books by Susan Shreve:

 The Flunking of Joshua T. Bates
 Joshua T. Bates Is In Trouble Again
 Joshua T. Bates Takes Charge

References 
 http://edhelper.com/books/The_Flunking_of_Joshua_T_Bates.htm
 https://www.amazon.com/Joshua-T-Bates-Takes-Charge/dp/0679870393

Characters in children's literature